Lucien Dulfan (born 14 February 1942, Frunze, Kyrgyz SSR) is a Soviet-born conceptualist artist, resident in the United States since 1990. During his career in the USSR, he was considered a Nonconformist artist.

Biography
Lucien Dulfan was born in 1942 in  Bishkek (then called Frunze, capital of Kyrgyz Soviet Socialist Republic) during World War II, where his family was evacuated. The family returned to Odessa in 1946. After finishing his school he was accepted to the Grekov Odessa Art school from which he graduated in 1963. He became a member of the Artists' Union of the USSR in 1973, while working as a graphic artist for the newspaper "Komsomolskaya Iskra". Lucien Dulfan emigrated with his family to the United States in 1990, settling in New York City. He has his studio at Mana Contemporary in Jersey City.

Work 
According to StrangeTime Art, Dulfan’s paintings "reflect the boundless energy, originality, and passion of the artist’s own personality." Lucien Dulfan also works with objects and installation art and creates so called "wooden paintings".“My art is dramatic, bold and uncompromising: I paint the very interesting human story through the filters of my dreams and subconscious.” — Lucien Dulfan

Exhibitions
 2014 — Odessa's Second Avant-Garde: City and Myth (Zimmerly Art Museum, New Brunswick, USA)
2012 — Broadway Gallery at Fountain Art Fair (New York, USA)
2011 — Space. Mythogony (Gallery Tadzio, Kyiv, Ukraine)
1989 — Museum of Western and Eastern Art, Odessa, USSR

Selected collections
Dulfan's work is included in the collections of The Museum of Odessa Modern Art and the Nancy Dodge Collection at Zimmerli Art Museum at Rutgers University in New Brunswick., and  Tretyakov gallery in Moscow, Tomskiy Oblastnoy Khudozhestvennyy Muzey

Publications 
1994 — Artists to "Literaturnaya Gazeta"
1992 — Glastnost Under Glass. Gorbachev from the artist's perspective

References

External links
 
 
 Artodessa.com gallery
 A World to Win
 Center For Book Arts site
 Encyclopedia of modern Ukraine
 interview with Dulfan (in Russian)
 Lucien Dulfan’s “Space. Mythogony”

1942 births
Living people
20th-century American painters
American male painters
21st-century American painters
Modern painters
Odesa Jews
People from Bishkek
Russian artists
Artists from Odesa
Jewish American artists
21st-century American Jews
20th-century American male artists